Trump: Surviving at the Top is a 1990 book written by businessman Donald Trump and journalist Charles Leerhsen, and published by Random House. In 1991, Warner Books purchased the paperback rights to the book and re-released it as The Art of Survival.

The photograph used for the book's cover was originally taken by Michael O'Brien for an article of Fortune magazine published on September 11, 1989. The photograph was later installed at the National Portrait Gallery after Trump was elected the 45th president of the United States.

Synopsis 
The book serves as a continuation and response to Trump: The Art of the Deal. In the introduction to the book, Trump wrote "Looking back on it, I see that writing The Art of the Deal was one of the most satisfying and fulfilling experiences of my life." Trump also commented on the debt that he faced after writing The Art of the Deal, as well as the problematic relationship of his then-wife Ivana Trump, claiming that his relationship with Marla Maples was "not the cause of the trouble between Ivana and me".

Writing and publication 
Trump wrote the book with Charles Leerhsen, who also worked as a senior writer for Newsweek at the time. Trump had considered naming the book Everybody Hates a Winner, stating that he sensed "a lot of jealousy and hostility from many people I do business with or see socially." As the book was being written, Trump was unsure if he would include details regarding his troubled marriage to Ivana Trump.

Peter Osnos, the book's editor, said in June 1990 that the book was being updated repeatedly. Editing of the book was completed on July 16, 1990. The book had initially been scheduled for release in October 1990, but was instead released in August 1990, because of the declining condition of Trump's finances and his separation from Ivana Trump. Because of the success of The Art of the Deal, Random House published and distributed approximately 500,000 copies of Surviving at the Top. After the book's release, Trump stated that it was "a transitional book," and that his next book "will be the real story, describing my comeback and the success of it all."

Warner Books paid Random House nearly $1 million for the paperback rights. Warner Books released the paperback version in July 1991, with a new title: The Art of Survival. Laurence Kirshbaum, the then-president of Warner Books, said, "We really thought 'The Art of Survival' was a more apt representation of what has happened in Trump's career recently." A new introduction was written by Trump for the paperback version.

Reception 
John Rothchild, writing for the Los Angeles Times, noted the different writing styles between Trump's first two books due to the change in Trump's ghostwriter. Rothchild also commented that Trump featured more pictures of himself with celebrities than his actual buildings. Meanwhile, Gary Bells of Fortune commented that Trump "taking the blame for mistakes is just not his style." Michael Lewis, writing for The New York Times, criticized Surviving at the Top, believing that the book "is a portrait of an ego gone haywire".

The book spent seven weeks on the New York Times Best Seller list, including two weeks at the number one spot. Trump's previous book, The Art of the Deal, had spent 48 weeks on the list. In October 1990, Trump stated that Random House expected to sell between 200,000 and 250,000 copies of the book, out of the 500,000 copies.

In January 2017, Michael Kranish of The Washington Post contrasted Trump's advice in Surviving at the Top to his later book, Think Like a Billionaire, and commented "to read Trump’s books is to find a man of contradiction."

References 

1990 non-fiction books
American memoirs
Biographies about businesspeople
Books about companies
Books about Donald Trump
Surviving at the Top
Finance books
Collaborative non-fiction books
Random House books
Self-help books